Children in Need 2006 was a campaign held in the United Kingdom to raise money for Children in Need. It culminated in a live broadcast on BBC One on the evening of Friday 17 November and was hosted by Terry Wogan, Natasha Kaplinsky, Fearne Cotton and Chris Moyles. The voice over reading out money raised at various points was Alan Dedicoat.  On average, the broadcast brought in 7.72m viewers and raised a total of £18,300,392 by the closing minute.

Television campaign

Artist performances
All Saints
Emma Bunton
Deacon Blue
Alesha Dixon
The Feeling
Nelly Furtado
Girls Aloud
Jamiroquai
Keane
Ronan Keating
Lemar
The Magic Numbers
McFly
Katie Melua
Dannii Minogue
Nerina Pallot
Status Quo
Sugababes
Sandi Thom
Westlife
Amy Winehouse

Cast performances
 The BBC News team performed a tribute to the James Bond films
 The cast of Two Pints of Lager and a Packet of Crisps performed Wham's "Club Tropicana"
 The cast of Holby City performed Madonna's "Hung Up"
 The cast of Bad Girls performed Bananarama's "Love in the First Degree"
 Chris Fountain, Andrew Moss, Gemma Merna and Carley Stenson from Hollyoaks performed "Unbelievable" by EMF in London whilst Gerard McCarthy, also from Hollyoaks, duetted with Sheila Ferguson live from Belfast.

Others
 West end performances from the casts of Daddy Cool, Guys and Dolls, Evita, The Sound of Music, Avenue Q and the award-winning musical Wicked.
 The new voice of the BT Speaking clock for the next 20 years was announced as Sara Mendes da Costa, a telemarketer and part-time voiceover artist.
 The winner of reality show Celebrity Scissorhands was announced.
 Rory Bremner performed a standup routine which lampooned many famous political people.
 QI broadcast a "Children in Need" episode on BBC Two when the news was on BBC One. The theme of the episodes was "Descendents" and featured Jonathan Ross, Phill Jupitus and Rich Hall.

Official single
Emma Bunton recorded the official single for 2006's appeal. The Baby Spice recorded a cover of Petula Clark's 60s classic Downtown especially for the charity. The single peaked at Number 3 on the UK Singles Chart.

Totals
The following are totals with the times they were announced on the televised show.

At 17 November 2006 23:40 GMT the total raised was  £9,684,158
At 18 November 2006 00:40 GMT the total raised was £12,608,849
At 18 November 2006 01:03 GMT the total raised was £16,052,161
At 18 November 2006 01:47 GMT the total raised was £16,950,588
At 18 November 2006 02:19 GMT the total raised was £18,300,392

The most recent total shown for the 2006 appeal was shown on the official website on 24 June 2007 at 18:40 GMT as £30,194,659

See also

References

External links
 

2006 in the United Kingdom
2006 in British television
2006
November 2006 events in the United States